Trimeresurus flavomaculatus (Philippine pit viper) is a venomous pit viper species endemic to the Philippines. Two subspecies are currently recognized, including the nominate subspecies described here.

Description
According to Leviton (1964), the scalation includes 21 rows of dorsal scales at midbody, 170–178/175–184 ventral scales in males/females, 62–71/58–63 subcaudal scales in males/females, and 9–11 supralabial scales of which the 3rd is the largest. Toriba and Sawai (1990) give 167–179/172–184 ventral scales in males/females, 56–70/53–63 subcaudal scales in males/females, and 9–10/9–12 supralabial scales in males/females.

Geographic range
Found on the Philippine islands of Agutayan, Batan, Camiguin, Catanduanes, Dinagat, Jolo, Leyte, Luzon, Mindanao, Mindoro, Negros, and Polillo. The type locality given is "Philippine Islands". Leviton (1964) proposed that this be restricted to "Luzon Island".

Subspecies

Taxonomy
Gumprecht (2001, 2002) relegates T. f. halieus to synonymy and elevates T. f. mcgregori to a full species.

References

Further reading
 Gray, J.E. 1842. Synopsis of the species of Rattle-Snakes, or Family of  CROTALIDAE. Zoological Miscellany 2: 47–51. ("Magæra flavomaculatus", p. 49.)
 Leviton, A.E. 1964. Contributions to a review of Philippine snakes, V. The snakes of the genus Trimeresurus. Philippine Journal of Science 93: 251–276.

External links

Parias (Trimeresurus) flavomaculatus images at Calphotos. Accessed 6 December 2007.

Reptiles described in 1842
Taxa named by John Edward Gray
Endemic fauna of the Philippines
Reptiles of the Philippines
flavomaculatus